Itapeva is a municipality in the state of Minas Gerais in Brazil. The population is 9,881 (2020 est.) in an area of 177 km².

The municipality contains part of the  Fernão Dias Environmental Protection Area, created in 1997.

References

Municipalities in Minas Gerais